The Gingerdead Man is a 2005 American comedy slasher film directed by Charles Band. Gary Busey stars as the titular Gingerdead Man, created from a mix of gingerbread spice mix and the ashes of deceased serial killer Millard Findlemeyer, who terrorizes a small-town bakery. The film also stars Robin Sydney, Jonathan Chase, Alexia Aleman, Margaret Blye, James Snyder, and Larry Cedar.

Plot
In a Waco, Texas diner, Cadillac Jack's, crazed killer Millard Findlemeyer opens fire on the Leigh family, killing Jeremy  and James, but leaving Sarah and her mother, Betty, alive. Findlemeyer is arrested and sentenced to die in the electric chair. After the execution, Findlemeyer is cremated, and his ashes are sent to his mother, a witch who mixes the ashes with a gingerbread spice mix. The Bakery, a pastry shop run by the Leighs, is in dire straits, and Betty has been reduced to a shotgun-toting alcoholic; Sarah sends her home with Bakery employee Julia. Jimmy Dean attempts to buy Sarah out, so he can knock down The Bakery, which he bemoans as an eyesore. After exchanging hostilities with Dean's daughter Lorna, Sarah defers the decision.

Sarah and Brick Fields, another Bakery employee, find a mysterious gingerbread spice mix left at their doorstep by Findlemeyer's mother. They set to using the mix, but Brick cuts himself, unknowingly allowing his blood to pollute the dough. Sarah permits him to leave early so he can pursue his amateur wrestling career as The Butcher-Baker at Wrestlepalooza. She makes a large gingerbread man with the contaminated dough and puts it in an industrial oven to bake. Lorna has returned and planted a rat in The Bakery so the health department will shut them down, but is discovered by Sarah. A fight ensues, during which Lorna hits a switch that causes a surge of electricity into the oven where the gingerbread man is cooking, animating it.

Amos Cadbury, Lorna's boyfriend, who has gotten tired of waiting outside for her, arrives on the scene. Sarah removes the gingerbread man from the oven, at which point the newly dubbed "Gingerdead Man" leaps up, taunting them. They attempt to lock the living cookie in the freezer, and Sarah tries to call the police but the line is dead. Lorna calls her dad on Amos’s cell phone before the batteries go dead. Betty comes back to look for her stash of alcohol, and Julia comes back looking for Betty. Betty loses a finger and is put into the oven, while Julia is knocked out by a frying pan, encased in frosting, decorated, and left in the freezer.

Amos returns to his car and retrieves a handgun. Jimmy Dean arrives to pick up Lorna. While he investigates Amos’s car, the Gingerdead Man takes Jimmy's car and, using a rolling pin to operate the accelerator, kills him by pinning him between the car and a wall. Amos and Sarah discover and rescue Julia from the freezer. Sarah tells Amos that she thinks the killer cookie is Millard. Lorna waits outside for her father, but discovers only his body sprawled over the hood of his car. She steals his ring and heads back inside, where she triggers a tripwire that lodges a knife into her forehead, killing her.

Sarah and Amos admit their feelings for one another before they find Betty and attempt to rescue her from the oven, but the Gingerdead Man locks Sarah in the oven and knocks Amos out with a hammer. Amos recovers, shoots the oven door's lock off, and saves Sarah. Brick returns to help, but the Gingerdead Man grabs Amos's pistol and opens fire. Julia and Brick manage to subdue him, and Brick eats the cookie's head. Shortly afterwards, Brick is possessed by the Gingerdead Man. He attacks Sarah before she is rescued by Amos and Julia, who push Brick into the oven and turn the heat on full, finally killing him.

Several months later, Betty, Sarah, and Amos are having a bake sale to raise money for the hospital, with a little help from two nurses. Two kids ask if they have any gingerbread cookies, and one of the nurses tells them that an older lady stopped by and dropped some off. The nurse opens the box, revealing five gingerbread cookies, who open their eyes. One of the gingerbread cookies is bought by a woman, who also buys a box full of pastries and ships them to her sister in Los Angeles.

Cast
 Gary Busey as Millard Findlemeyer / The Gingerdead Man
 Robin Sydney as Sarah Leigh
 Ryan Locke as Amos Cadbury
 Alexia Aleman as Lorna Dean
 Jonathan Chase as 'Brick' Fields
 Margaret Blye as Betty Leigh
 Daniela Melgoza as Julia
 Newell Alexander as James Leigh
 James Snyder as Jeremy Leigh
 Larry Cedar as Jimmy Dean
 E. Dee Biddlecome as Millard's mother
 Debra Mayer as Nurse #1
 Kaycee Shank as Nurse #2

Production
In an interview with PopHorror.com, Charles Band reportedly offered Busey $25,000 to star in the film expecting him to turn it down but Busey accepted.

Reception

The horror website Bloody Good Horror gave the film a negative review, stating "It's one of the shortest, yet hardest to watch, films. [sic] I've ever seen." Criticisms were directed at the film's humor and it's writing.

According to Horror Society this film lacks a plot and makes very little sense. The review stated the "acting was atrocious" and "insanely stupefied."

Like many other Full Moon properties, the film spawned a franchise of sequels, crossovers, shorts, and comic books, as well as merchandise.

Sequels and crossover film
On October 9, 2007, it was revealed that Gingerdead Man 2: Passion of the Crust had begun shooting. It was released in 2008. It included new monsters called "Tiny Terrors" (a pun on the unreleased Puppet Master Bobblehead line and an homage to the Full Moon’s many “killer toy“ properties)

On July 16, 2008, Charles Band announced a third film, Gingerdead Man 3: Saturday Night Cleaver. The film was slated for a 2009 release, but filming was delayed until January 2010. The film was released on September 13, 2011, and sees the Gingerdead Man travel back in time to slash his way through a Roller Disco Competition.

In 2013 Gingerdead Man vs. Evil Bong was released serving as the fourth film in the Gingerdead Man series while also being a crossover with the Evil Bong films. It follows the Gingerdead Man’s quest for vengeance on survivor Sarah Leigh.

A 5th movie titled Gingerdead Man: Rebaked! was announced in a pre credits teaser in Evil Bong 666 (2017) but never got made

Prominence in the Evil Bong series
Starting with Gingerdead Man vs. Evil Bong, The Gingerdead Man serves as a reoccurring antagonist, appearing in Evil Bong 420 as the main antagonist and Evil Bong High-5! as a supporting character, returning in Evil Bong 666 as the secondary antagonist. The character Sarah Leigh also becomes a supporting character in the Evil Bong series going forward, and is referred to in Evil Bong 666 and 777 as Faux Batty Boop.

He's also the overarching antagonist of Evil Bong 777 though remaining dead the entire film. He is set to return in Evil Bong 888: Infinity High.

Comic books
On December 7, 2015, Action Lab Comics and Full Moon Features announced a new comic book series based on the cult classic films. The first issue, The Gingerdead Man: Baking Bad #1, was written by Brockton McKinney (Ehmm Theory, Killer Queen), with art by Sergio Rios, and variant covers by the creator of Zombie Tramp, Dan Mendoza. Issue #1 of The Gingerdead Man: Baking Bad launched on February 3, 2016.

Another comic series was released on March 28, 2018, by Action Lab Comics titled The Gingerdead Man Meets Evil Bong, a crossover with the Evil Bong films. It is loosely inspired by the crossover film Gingerdead Man vs. Evil Bong. The comic is also written by Brockton McKinney with the artwork being done by Sergio Rios. The comic series consists of only three issues. On May 30, 2018, a volume of all three issues was released.

Merchandise
Trick or Treat Studios released a full head mask of the Gingerdead Man in collaboration with Full Moon Features. The mask was designed by special makeup effects artist Tom Devlin.

Full Moon would later release an 8.75 inch tall resin statue of the Gingerdead Man that is available for purchase on their online market place Full Moon Direct.

In celebration of the release of Gingerdead Man vs. Evil Bong, a limited edition cereal box was made available that depicts the titular characters on opposite sides of the box in with unique artwork. It comes with the DVD of the movie along with special features, and multi-grain cereal called "Nookie Crisp" or "Weedies" in reference to the characters.

References

External links
 
 
 
 The Gingerdead Man at Something Awful

2000s Christmas horror films
2005 films
2005 comedy horror films 
American slasher films
Full Moon Features films
American comedy horror films 
American Christmas horror films
Films directed by Charles Band
Films about witchcraft
Puppet films
American ghost films
American films about revenge
Slasher comedy films
Supernatural slasher films
Supernatural comedy films
American exploitation films
2005 comedy films
American splatter films
Gingerdead Man (film series)
2000s English-language films
2000s American films